Brooklyn Orchid is a 1942 American comedy film directed by Kurt Neumann and written by Earle Snell and Clarence Marks that was one of Hal Roach's Streamliners. The film stars William Bendix, Joe Sawyer, Marjorie Woodworth, Grace Bradley, Richard "Skeets" Gallagher, Florine McKinney and Leonid Kinskey. The film was released on January 31, 1942, by United Artists.

This was the first of the so-called Taxi Comedies series, which featured Bendix, Sawyer, and Bradley playing the same characters. The latter two films were The McGuerins from Brooklyn and Taxi, Mister.

Plot

A couple of cab drivers, Tim McGuerin and Eddie Corbett, cope with the women in their lives. Tim's social-climbing wife Sadie has a secret, that she once worked as a stripper. Eddie's conniving sweetheart Mabel plans to use this information against Sadie when she becomes irritated by her.

Tim and Eddie go fishing and catch a whopper—a beautiful woman. Lucy Gibbs turns out to be the winner of the "Brooklyn Orchid" beauty pageant, but rather than be pleased, she's actually making a suicide attempt over its adverse effect on her life. She now blames Tim and Eddie for spoiling her plans.

The boys take their ladies to a health spa, but Lucy follows them and complicates matters. When a band strikes up, Mabel announces that Sadie is in the room and can do her "act". Lucy saves the day, pretending to be Sadie and hiding her secret. Sadie then cuts up Mabel's dress and tosses her into a swimming pool. Tim and Eddie decide not to go fishing again.

Cast  
 William Bendix as Timothy 'Tim' McGuerin
 Joe Sawyer as Eddie Corbett
 Marjorie Woodworth as Lucy 'The Brooklyn Orchid' Gibbs
 Grace Bradley as Sadie McGuerin
 Richard "Skeets" Gallagher as Tommy Lyman Goodweek
 Florine McKinney as Mabel Cooney
 Leonid Kinskey as Ignatz Rachkowsky
 Rex Evans as Sterling, McGuerin's Butler
 Jack Norton as Jonathan McFeeder
 Ray Walker as Orchestra Leader/Emcee

References

External links 
 

1942 films
American black-and-white films
Films directed by Kurt Neumann
United Artists films
1942 comedy films
American comedy films
Films scored by Edward Ward (composer)
1940s English-language films
1940s American films